Associated Press of Pakistan (APP) is a government-operated national news agency of Pakistan. APP has News Exchange Agreements with 37 Foreign News Agencies and has more than 500 correspondents.

History

Antecedents
The news agency called Associated Press of India (API) was formed in British India in 1905 and was acquired by Reuters in 1915. In the 1940s, Reuters altered its constitution enabling co-partnership of news agencies in British Dominions, and the Associated Press of India became an independent company in 1946, though with significant backing by Reuters.

After the Partition of India in August 1947, API continued to function for more than a year. Some Indian journalists such as G. K. Reddy worked in Pakistani areas. In 1948, the Indian press formed the Press Trust of India to take over the operations of API, which occurred in September 1948. In January 1949, the Pakistani operations were reorganised as a Reuters subsidiary under the name "Associated Press of Pakistan". In September 1949, company was transferred to national control.

Initial years
The APP was organised as a trust, with the Chief Justice of Pakistan serving as the chairman of the board of trustees The remaining members of the board were elected on two-year terms.
The new-born country's press was economically weak, and was thus unable to financially support the agency. APP asked the Government of Pakistan for financial support, which was granted in the form of loans and subsidies. Government support enabled APP to subscribe to the services of the world's news agencies and to open offices in major cities of Pakistan.

Government take-over
The financial situation of APP continued to deteriorate until it was on the verge of collapse. This was a direct result of the withholding of payment of funds from the Government of Pakistan due towards APP from the Ministry of Information and Broadcasting in an effort to create a financial crisis for the national news agency. In the early 1960s, APP owed about Rs. 8 lakhs (Rupees 800,000) to the government's Post and Telegraph Department and another Rs. 12 lakhs (Rupees 1200,000) in unpaid subscription fees to foreign news agencies. The Government of Pakistan intervened and took over the agency on 15 July 1961 following the instructions of certain vested interests within the Government of Pakistan. A government ordinance was issued for it. The given reason was to strengthen APP's financial foundation.

The takeover took place with several changes: Malik Tajuddin was removed and A K Qureshi, a senior government officer with some journalistic experience, was hired as Administrator of APP. The head office of the agency was shifted to Islamabad, the new capital of Pakistan. While the financial position of the agency further deteriorated, its coverage became more biased as the government started to use it as an official mouthpiece. A K Qureshi was a member of the ill-fated National Press Trust delegation traveling to London by PIA Flight 705 that crashed at Cairo on 20 May 1965. He is buried in a mass grave at Cairo alongside his fellow passengers: victims of Pakistan's first jet aircraft disaster.

In 2015, Information Minister Pervaiz Rashid and a three-member committee had conducted interviews of 18 candidates for the position of Managing Director of Associated Press of Pakistan to be able to finally appoint a Managing Director.

Editorial operation
Besides its head office in Islamabad, APP maintains five bureaus at Karachi, Lahore, Peshawar Quetta and Rawalpindi and eight news centres at Sukkur, Multan, Quetta, Faisalabad, Larkana, Hyderabad, Muzaffarabad ,Sialkot and now Gilgit-Baltistan .

The editorial function of any news agency is the same as that of a newspaper i.e. it is divided between reporting teams and the news desk. In smaller centres, the editorial staff consists of a reporter and sub-editor. The reporting team is composed of about reporters, responsible for specific beats such as economy, sports, crime, national and provincial assemblies or major government departments. These news desks are responsible for copy-writing and for coordinating activities of the reporting team. They also handle press releases of government information and private organisations including national and international NGOs, embassies and foreign missions

The whole news operation is monitored by a Central News Desk (CND) located at the head office in Islamabad. News stories, features, write-ups from all bureaus are sent to Islamabad for editing and from there the combined service is distributed nationally. The CND is connected with foreign news agencies, local and foreign newspapers, government entities, TV channels, Radio via an internet.

Communication networks
Despite APP being considered Pakistan's "premier" news agency, for decades the  agency ran on old, obsolete and unreliable equipment. News copy was being carried on a 50-baud duplex circuit between Islamabad, Karachi and Lahore.

M. Aftab, APPs General-Manager in 1991, undertook to improve the agency's technical resources. The resulting upgrade saw a transformation of data output speed from 50 words per minute (WMP) to 1200 WPM, most of which is now directly fed into the computers of the subscribers simultaneously throughout Pakistan and overseas.

Subscribers
Being the national news agency of Pakistan, APP collects and disseminate domestic and international news to 84 (1992) newspapers of Pakistan besides radio, television and government offices and some foreign media. APP's subscription rates are higher than other agencies in Pakistan, due to its credibility and services. For this reason every newspaper in Pakistan tries to subscribe to its services. Notable newspaper subscribers to APP's services include: Dawn, Pakistan Times, Frontier Post, The Statesman, The Nation, The News International, Business Recorder,  The Observer,  The Post and Nawa-i-Waqt, Jang, Khabrain, Daily Express (Urdu newspaper), The Express Tribune and some other English and Urdu national newspapers.

Staff
The number of APP's employees is estimated at between 800 and 1000, of whom over 200 to 350 are journalists and photographers while the rest are administrative staff, including computer engineers, technicians, peons, traffic attendants, data entry operators and finance staff.

In addition there are a small number of "stringers" (part-time correspondents) at various district headquarters in Pakistan and aboard.

After decades gap the system of journalists posting aboard was revived during the first tenure of Mr. M. Aftab. He secured approval of the Ministry to post four senior journalists as special correspondents in Washington D.C., London, Beijing and New Delhi.

The massive political induction by Musharraf government's Information Minister Muhammad Ali Durrani and subsequently by PPP-led democratic government at federation from 2008 up till now (October 2015) have badly affected the financial position of APP. The organisation is unable to pay medical, telephones, newspapers bills, over time, feature and other allowances. The very unfortunate thing was that the backbone of the organisation are journalists but they are very less in number as compare to other staff members of the entity.

Management and financing
APP is a government organisation, responsible to the Ministry of Information and Broadcasting. The agency is headed by a Director-General, appointed by the Ministry. Also it has a Managing Director (MD) of APP, appointed by the government.

Since the government takeover, APP has continued with an undefined status – neither an official government body nor an independent news outfit, APP has drawn criticism as a mouthpiece for the government of the day. In 1998, however, a Bill was proposed to convert APP into a corporation. On 19 October 2002 an Ordinance converted APP into a corporation and renamed it Associated Press of Pakistan Corporation (APPC).

Due to this unclear status, there is no long-term financing in place for APP, with allocations being made on an annual basis by the Ministry of Information and Broadcasting. APP's annual expenditure is now placed at Rs. 140 million. APP generates 60% of its revenue from the government, and the remainder is raised through subscription from electronic media including television and radio and newspapers as well as foreign news agencies, business and non-media subscribers.

Services provided by APP

News service
Pakistan has two major news agencies: Associated Press of Pakistan and Pakistan Press International.

The APP News Service is mainly divided into three main areas: official, political and district news.

Official news
APP provides detailed coverage of the activities and statements of government dignitaries. Newspapers and the government-controlled radio and television rely heavily on APP for government news. According to renowned journalist Zamir Niazi:
"Most of the time and energy of APP since the days of Ayub Khan is being consumed in creeding long speeches of the president and other ministries, the rest are allocated to the government press notes and other lesser government functionaries."

Political & Other news
Being the government agency, APP mainly focuses on government news, besides promoting cultural, social, economic and other sectors of national life. The organisation is well known for its credibility, as being a state owned news agency it has to demonstrate it indeed.

APP also gives coverage to opposition leaders and parties in center and at provincial level but keeping in view its policy and as allow by the federal government.

District news
APP's district news service is not highly regarded, as its resources are so thinly placed across the country that most of the information from this department comes from government information officers.

Foreign news
APP has become the main source of international news for the Pakistani media. The agency subscribes to Reuters, AFP, and the Associated Press of America (AP). United Press International was also linked with APP, but the agreement was allowed to lapse.

APP has co-operation agreements with some 35 news agencies, mainly in third world countries. Under these agreements, news is exchanged on a barter basis. Prominent among these are the Islamic Republic News Agency (IRNA), the Press Trust of India, and MENA (Egypt).

Commercial service
The commercial service of APP provides currency and commodity rates from Reuters, financial and economic services, banks and large business houses. APP planned to expand this service, but suffered a setback in the mid-1980s when Reuters bypassed APP and began to sell its financial services directly to business houses and newspapers in Pakistan.

Photo service
APP has its own photographic section equipped with photo receivers and photo transmitters in Karachi, Lahore, Islamabad and Quetta respectively. Islamabad is the head office to receive photographs from within Pakistan and aboard, and transmits them to the agency's bureaux and stations which distribute them to local newspapers.

Urdu service
The agency's Urdu language service started in the 1980s to cater for the needs of the growing number of Urdu language dailies in Pakistan. The idea behind the setting-up of the service was to avoid errors and ensure accuracy. As a practice, Urdu speech was often translated into English by the APP and then back into Urdu by newspaper editor – greatly increasing the chances of translation, emphasis or context errors. The Urdu Service, while still small, has been effective in producing text in both languages.

Feature & Write Up Service
APP editorial staff regularly contribute English and Urdu feature and write ups on socio-economic issues including education, health, business which are well carried by national dailies.

Video News Service
The Visual News Service (VNS)was launches during 2007 with a special focus to provide electronic news coverage of President, Prime Minister, Parliament House to private media national and international channels The project was initiated on an idea to launch APP's own news channel but financial restraints have hindered the idea and confined it to VNS service only.

References

Bibliography

External links
 Associated Press of Pakistan official website

Companies based in Islamabad
News agencies based in Pakistan
State media
Pakistan federal departments and agencies
Ministry of Information and Broadcasting (Pakistan)